Amadou Haidara  (born 31 January 1998) is a Malian professional footballer who plays as a midfielder for Bundesliga club RB Leipzig and the Mali national team.

Club career

Red Bull Salzburg
Haidara started his career with the Malian side JMG Academy Bamako. In July 2016, he was signed by FC Red Bull Salzburg. He was sent out on loan to the second league side FC Liefering, which is the farm team of Red Bull Salzburg. Haidara also played for the FC Red Bull Salzburg U-19 team in the UEFA Youth League. There he scored two goals versus FK Vardar.

He made his first appearance in the third round of the 2016–17 league versus LASK Linz. He substituted Gideon Mensah after the halftime break and scored his first goal in the 48th minute for Liefering.

During the 2017–18 season, Salzburg had their best ever European campaign. They finished top of their Europa League group, for a record fourth time, before beating Real Sociedad and Borussia Dortmund thus making their first ever appearance in the UEFA Europa League semi-final. On 3 May 2018, he played in the Europa League semi-finals as Olympique de Marseille played out a 1–2 away loss but a 3–2 aggregate win to secure a place in the 2018 UEFA Europa League Final.

RB Leipzig
On 22 December 2018, Haidara was signed by German club RB Leipzig. On 30 March 2019, he scored his first Bundesliga goal in a 5–0 win over Hertha BSC. In the 2019–20 season, RB Leipzig managed to reach the Champions League semi-finals. 

On 8 December 2020, he scored his first Champions League goal in a 3–2 win over Manchester United in the 2020–21 season.

International career
Haidara played five matches for the Malian U17 team, scoring one goal. Haidara made his senior debut for the Mali national football team in a 2018 World Cup qualification tie against Ivory Coast on 6 October 2017.

Career statistics

Club

International

International goals
Scores and results list Mali's goal tally first.

Honours
Red Bull Salzburg
Austrian Bundesliga: 2016–17, 2017–18
Austrian Cup: 2016–17

RB Leipzig
 DFB-Pokal: 2021–22

Mali U17
FIFA U-17 World Cup runner-up: 2015

Individual
Austrian Bundesliga Team of the Year: 2017–18

References

External links

Profile at the RB Leipzig website

1998 births
Living people
Sportspeople from Bamako
Association football midfielders
Malian footballers
Mali international footballers
Malian expatriate footballers
Malian expatriate sportspeople in Austria
Expatriate footballers in Austria
2. Liga (Austria) players
Austrian Football Bundesliga players
Bundesliga players
FC Red Bull Salzburg players
FC Liefering players
RB Leipzig players
Malian expatriate sportspeople in Germany
Expatriate footballers in Germany
Mali youth international footballers
Mali under-20 international footballers
2019 Africa Cup of Nations players
2021 Africa Cup of Nations players